Udaya Kumar or Udayakumar may refer to:

 Udaya Kumar (academic), professor at Jawaharlal Nehru University
 Udaya Kumar (designer), designer of the Indian rupee sign
 Udaya Kumar (director), Indian film director and editor
 K. Udayakumar, Indian volleyball player
 R. V. Udayakumar, Tamil actor and director
 S. P. Udayakumar, Indian anti-nuclear activist
 Udaykumar (1933–1985), Indian film actor and producer in Kannada cinema